Sellotape is a British brand of transparent, polypropylene-based, pressure-sensitive tape, and is the leading brand in the United Kingdom. Sellotape is generally used for joining, sealing, attaching and mending.

In much the same way that Scotch Tape came to be used in Canada and the United States when referring to any brand of clear adhesive tape, Sellotape has become a genericised trademark in Britain and a number of other countries where it is sold.

Sellotape continued to be made in Borehamwood until the late 1960s/early 1970s.

History
Sellotape was originally manufactured in 1937 by Colin Kinninmonth and George Grey, in Acton, west London. The name was derived from cellophane, at that time a trademarked name, with the "C" changed to "S" so the new name could be trademarked.

Sellotape was made at a factory in Borehamwood, Hertfordshire, from 1930 to about 1950 when it moved to Welwyn Garden City or thereabouts. One of the factory designers was E.F. Peat, an architect working for E.S. & A. Robinson of Redcliffe Street in Bristol, who was ultimately given the job of factory manager. The range of tapes available in the 1950s and 1960s was immense compared with what is available now on the retail market, including RBT (reinforced banding tape), metallic tapes and a tape used for repairing PCBs; E.S. & A. Robinson were originally a packaging and paper products manufacturing company.

In the 1960s, a small group of Wallington based chemists led by a man named Alan Robinson undertook a development of the stickiness in this product, and from the 1960s to 1980s, the Sellotape company was part of Dickinson Robinson Group, a British packaging and paper conglomerate.

Sellotape Industrial was bought by Scapa Group plc in 1997, and their products continue to be manufactured at its factory in Dunstable.

The Sellotape company was bought by Henkel Consumer Adhesives in 2002.

Products

The Sellotape brand now covers a variety of tape products, and the word is frequently used to refer to other adhesive tapes in many countries due to its market exposure. As an example of a genericized trademark, it gained an entry in the Oxford English Dictionary in 1980.

Use
The tape can be used to repair tears in paper, or to attach pieces of paper or cardboard together for modelling.  On fragile paper surfaces the tape can only be used once, as removing it will either tear the paper or remove the top layer of rough cardboard; on smooth painted surfaces it can generally be removed without leaving any trace, though sometimes the adhesive can remain on the surface after prolonged periods of time.  It does not affix items to such surfaces permanently.

See also
Adhesive tape
Duct Tape
Masking tape
Scotch Tape
 List of adhesive tapes

References

External links
 Official website

Adhesive tape
Office equipment
Henkel brands
British brands
British inventions
Manufacturing companies of the United Kingdom
Companies based in Cheshire

es:Celo adhesivo